Rancho Cañada de Guadalupe la Visitación y Rodeo Viejo (also called Ridley's Rancho) was a   Mexican land grant in present-day San Mateo County, California and San Francisco County, California given in 1841 by Governor Juan Alvarado to Jacob P. Leese.  The rancho included three separate valleys: Cañada de Guadalupe, La Visitacion, and Rodeo Viejo. Rancho contained most of the present-day San Bruno Mountain, the city of Brisbane, Guadalupe Valley, and Visitacion Valley.

History

Jacob Primer Leese (1809–1892), a trader from Ohio married María Rosalia Vallejo sister of General Mariano Guadalupe Vallejo in 1837. Lesse, who first came to California in 1833, took possession of the land grant entitled Rancho Cañada de Guadalupe la Visitacion y Rodeo Viejo in 1838, three years before he received the official title to the land.

Around the year 1843, Lesse traded his two league grant to Robert T. Ridley (1818-1851) for the three league Rancho Collayomi in Lake County. Ridley was an English sailor who was captain of the Port of San Francisco, and had married Presentación Briones.  Ridley never lived on the property nor developed it to any extent. Ridley died in 1851 and the land was sold at a sheriff's auction with  going to Robert E. Eaton and the rest to Alfred Wheeler.  Alfred Wheeler (1822–1903) was a prominent San Francisco land title lawyer.  In 1865 Henry R. Payson acquired  which was soon subdivided, with the Visitacion Land Company acquiring the largest portion.

Claims by Presentación Ridley were dismissed.

Central Pacific railroad magnate and banker Charles Crocker acquired  of the Rancho in 1884 and another  the following year. Crocker died in 1888 and the land became an asset of the Crocker Land Co. and then the Foremost McKesson Co.

References

Cañada de Guadalupe la Visitacion y Rodeo Viejo
Cañada de Guadalupe la Visitacion y Rodeo Viejo
Cañada de Guadalupe la Visitacion y Rodeo Viejo